U.S. Route 28 (US 28) was an east–west United States Numbered Highway that was located completely in the U.S. state of Oregon. It connected US 99 in Eugene with US 30 in Ontario.  It existed from 1926 to 1952.

History
In 1937, US 28 was truncated from Florence to Eugene, which then became its western terminus in Eugene. US 28 was replaced with US 26 when US 26 was extended from Wyoming to the Pacific Ocean in 1952. The portion of US 28 from Ontario to Prineville became US 26. That highway then continued in a northwesterly direction to Portland and Astoria. From Prineville to Eugene, US 28 became U.S. Route 126, now known as Oregon Route 126.

Route description

US 28 began at US 99 in Eugene before continuing to Sisters and Redmond, where the route met US 97. Continuing east, the highway traveled concurrently with US 395 to Prineville.

At the intersection with Route 126, the old designation of US 28 follows US 26 and picks up the Ochoco Highway No. 41, which also follows OR 126 west to US 97 in Redmond. The Ochoco Highway ends at OR 19 near Dayville, from which US 28 followed the John Day Highway No. 5 through John Day to US 20 in Vale. The remainder of US 28 in Oregon overlapped US 20 on the Central Oregon Highway No. 7 to the Idaho state line.

Major intersections

See also

References

External links

 Endpoints of U.S. Highway 28

28
U.S. Highways in Oregon
Transportation in Lane County, Oregon
Transportation in Deschutes County, Oregon
Transportation in Crook County, Oregon
Transportation in Wheeler County, Oregon
Transportation in Grant County, Oregon
Transportation in Baker County, Oregon
Transportation in Malheur County, Oregon
U.S. Route 26
28